Eugene Kincaid Felt (April 11, 1838 in Webster, New York – July 21, 1915) was a member of the Wisconsin State Assembly a lower part of Wisconsin Legislature.

Biography
Felt was born on April 11, 1838 in Webster, New York. He would attend Beloit College before working as a farmer in Newark, Wisconsin. On May 16, 1861, Felt married Libbie Morris. They would have eight children, including Dorr Felt, inventor of the comptometer.

Political career
Felt was a member of the Assembly from 1872 to 1873. Additionally, he chaired the town board (similar to city council) of Newark and was a county supervisor of Rock County, Wisconsin. In 1888, he was a delegate to the Kansas State Republican Convention.

References

People from Webster, New York
People from Rock County, Wisconsin
Republican Party members of the Wisconsin State Assembly
Wisconsin city council members
County supervisors in Wisconsin
Kansas Republicans
Farmers from Wisconsin
Beloit College alumni
1838 births
1915 deaths